Dairo-Didizo is a town in southern Ivory Coast. It is a sub-prefecture of Guitry Department in Lôh-Djiboua Region, Gôh-Djiboua District.

Dairo-Didizo was a commune until March 2012, when it became one of 1126 communes nationwide that were abolished.

In 2014, the population of the sub-prefecture of Dairo-Didizo was 47,34447,344.

Villages

The 14 villages of the sub-prefecture of Dairo-Didizo and their population in 2014 are:

References

Sub-prefectures of Lôh-Djiboua
Former communes of Ivory Coast